Roxana Gómez Calderón (born January 7, 1999) is a Cuban sprinter. She was a member of the national team in the 4×400 metres relay race at the 2016 Summer Olympics. She competed at the 2020 Summer Olympics.

International competitions

1Did not finish in the final

References

External links

 

1999 births
Living people
Cuban female sprinters
Olympic athletes of Cuba
Athletes (track and field) at the 2016 Summer Olympics
Athletes (track and field) at the 2020 Summer Olympics
Athletes (track and field) at the 2019 Pan American Games
Pan American Games competitors for Cuba
Central American and Caribbean Games medalists in athletics
Olympic female sprinters
People from Cienfuegos
21st-century Cuban women